Protactinium oxide may refer to:

 , PaO
 Protactinium(IV) oxide, PaO2
 Protactinium(V) oxide, Pa2O5

See also
 Protactinium#Chemical compounds